Double top may refer to:
Double top and double bottom, reversal chart patterns observed in the technical analysis of financial trading markets of stocks, commodities, currencies, and other assets 
 a double twenty score in darts